The 1919 Rice Owls football team was an American football team that represented Rice University as a member of the Southwest Conference (SWC) during the 1919 college football season. In its seventh season under head coach Philip Arbuckle, the team compiled an 8–1 record (3–1 against SWC opponents), and outscored opponents by a total of 190 to 60.

Schedule

References

Rice
Rice Owls football seasons
Rice Owls football